"Over You" is the third mainstream single (the fourth overall) from Daughtry's first album, Daughtry. It was first announced by Chris Daughtry at Summerfest 2007, and was released July 24, 2007 to digital retailers as well as Top 40 and Adult Contemporary radio. "Over You" was written by Chris Daughtry and Brian Howes, who also co-wrote previous single, "What I Want". The song was originally rumored to be the second single having been voted the fans' choice for second single on a poll on the band's site, where it continuously received the most votes for favorite song from the album.

It won an award at the BMI Awards on May 19, 2009.

Song meaning
In a radio interview, Chris Daughtry said the song is a breakup song about the difficulties of getting over someone, until one day you finally do ("The day I thought I'd never get through, I got over you"). Chris' quote on the meaning of "Over You":

Music video 
The video for the song was shot with director P.R. Brown in Los Angeles on July 17 and 18, 2007. The video was supposed to be premiered on Yahoo! on August 16, but was removed from the site's upcoming video premieres list. It later returned for a short time on the list to be released on August 27, 2007, but it was again removed, and was not released schedule. Chris revealed in an interview that the video was delayed because the band was unsatisfied with certain elements of it, and the video was still in the editing phase. He went on to state that they wanted to make sure that they were happy with the video before its release.

The video was premiered on September 20, 2007 on VH1.com. The video is about a girl named Sarah (scene name only), played by Jessica Szohr, who is struggling with alcoholism. She is seen at the beginning of the video with her boyfriend at a party, becoming drunk, while her boyfriend watches on in dismay. After the party, they end up in a car crash caused by her alcohol problems. Following the accident, Sarah is seen grief-stricken and depressed over what she has caused, and cannot seem to get over her alcoholism. The video ends with Sarah coming to grips with her problem and seeking help by going to Alcoholics Anonymous. The band is shown playing in a broken down house throughout the video.

Chart performance 
The single was released to Top 40 radio on July 24, 2007. It quickly began receiving heavy airplay from many stations, including New York's Z100. It entered the Billboard Hot 100 at number 94, and peaked at number eighteen, becoming the band's third top twenty hit on the chart. It is also their third top twenty hit in Canada, and their third top forty hit in New Zealand. On the U.S. Adult Top 40, it is the band's third top three hit. As of January 2011, "Over You" has sold 1,315,000 in digital downloads.

Weekly charts

Year-end charts

Certifications

References

2006 songs
2007 singles
Daughtry (band) songs
Songs written by Chris Daughtry
Rock ballads
Songs written by Brian Howes
Song recordings produced by Howard Benson
19 Recordings singles
RCA Records singles